Social defeat is a concept used in the study of the physiological and behavioral effects of hostile interactions among either conspecific animals, or humans, in either a dyadic or in a group-individual context, potentially generating very significant consequences in terms of control over resources, access to mates and social positions.

Background

Research on social stress has accumulated a useful body of knowledge, providing perspective on the effects of detrimental social and environmental interaction on the brain. Research and experimentation suffer from many methodological difficulties: usually a lack of ecological validity (similarity with natural conditions and stressors) or are not amenable to scientific investigation (difficult to test and verify).

Social psychology approaches to human aggression have developed a multitude of perspectives, based on observations of human phenomena like bullying, mobbing, physical and verbal abuse, relational and indirect aggression, etc. Despite the richness of theories developed, the body of knowledge generated has not satisfied scientific requirements of testability and verifiability.

Animal studies of within-species aggression developed in 2 main branches: A) approaches based on laboratory experiments, on controlled conditions, allowing the measurement of behavioral, endocrine and neurological variables, but with the shortcoming of applying unnatural stressors (such as foot-shocks and restraint stress) in unnatural conditions (laboratory cages rarely approximate native habitats); B) approaches based on observations of animals in naturalistic settings, which avoided artificial environments and unnatural stresses, but usually not allowing the measurement of physiological effects or the manipulation of relevant variables.

In real life situations, animals (including humans) have to cope with stresses generated within their own species, during their interactions with conspecifics, especially due to recurrent struggles over the control of limited resources, mates and social positions (Bjorkqvist, 2001; Rohde, 2001; Allen & Badcock, 2003).

Social defeat is a source of chronic stress in animals and humans, capable of causing significant changes in behaviour, brain functioning, physiology, neurotransmitter and hormone levels, and health (Bjorkqvist, 2001; Rohde, 2001; Allen & Badcock, 2003).

History
The social defeat approach was originated from animal experiments, using the "resident-intruder" paradigm, in which an animal was placed in the cage of another animal or group of animals of the same species, in a manner that allowed a non-lethal conflict. It has been documented to produce anxiety-like and depressive-like behavioral declines in susceptible mice, for instance.

If animals are allowed to fight on a single occasion only, it is usually regarded as a model of acute stress; if they are allowed to fight on several occasions, on different days, consecutive or not, it is regarded as a model of chronic stress. 
After the defeat or in the interval between fights, the subordinate animal may also be exposed to threats from the dominant one, by having to stay in a cage or compartment beside or nearby the dominant, exposed to its visual or olfactory cues.

Later, the social defeat approach was also applied to observations of animal within-species aggression, in the wild, which suggested that the hypotheses generated on artificial laboratory settings can also be applied in observed in natural settings, confirming the predictions of the model.

In humans
It has been proposed that animal models of social conflict may be useful for studying a number of mental disorders, including major depression, generalized anxiety disorder, post-traumatic stress disorder, drug abuse, aggressive psychopathologies, eating disorders and schizophrenia (Bjorkqvist, 2001; Selten & Cantor-Graae, 2005; Rohde, 2001).

The social defeat model has been extended to include observations of human aggression, bullying, relational aggression, chronic subordination and humiliation.  The social defeat model attempts to extend animal studies to include human behaviour as well, in contrast to the social psychology study of aggression, in which comparisons are drawn exclusively from experiments involving humans (Bjorkqvist, 2001; Rohde, 2001).

Bullying has interesting parallels with animal models of social defeat, the bully being equivalent to the dominant animal and the victim the subordinate one. At stake are possessions of material objects, money, etc., social position in the group, represented by in-group prestige, and the consequent lack of access to mates, including for socio-sexual behaviors like copulation. Human victims typically experience symptoms like low self-esteem (due to low regard by the group), feelings of depression (due to unworthiness of efforts), social withdrawal (reduced investments in the social environment), anxiety (due to a threatening environment), and they can also be shown to experience a plethora of physiological effects, e.g. increased corticosterone levels, and also a shift towards sympathetic balance in the autonomic nervous system (Bjorkqvist, 2001).

Research about human aggression, usually conducted by psychologists or social psychologists, resembles to a great extent the research about social defeat and animal aggression, usually conducted by biologists or physiological psychologists. However, there is the problem of the use of different terminologies for similar concepts, which hinders communication between the two bodies of knowledge (Bjorkqvist, 2001).

Similarly, research on depression has employed similar constructs, such as learned helplessness, although that theory is focused on the perceived inability to escape any sort of negative stimuli rather than on social factors.

Behavioral and physiological effects
Social defeat is a very potent stressor and can lead to a variety of behavioral effects, like social withdrawal (reduced interactions with conspecifics), lethargy (reduced locomotor activity), reduced exploratory behavior (of both open field and novel objects), anhedonia (reduced reward-related behaviors), decreased socio-sexual behaviors (including decreased attempts to mate and copulate after defeat), various motivational deficits, decreased levels of testosterone (due to a decline in the functionality of the Leydig cells of the testes), increased tendencies to stereotyped behaviours and self-administration of drugs and alcohol (Rygula et alli, 2005; Huhman, 2006).

Research also implicates that the referred behavioral effects are moderated by neuroendocrine phenomena involving serotonin, dopamine, epinephrine, norepinephrine, and in the hypothalamic-pituitary-adrenal axis, locus ceruleus and limbic systems (Bjorkqvist, 2001; Rygula et alli, 2005; Selten & Cantor-Graae, 2005; Marinia et alli, 2006; Huhman, 2006).

Both animal and human studies suggest that the social environment has a strong influence on the consequences of stresses. This finding seems to be especially true in the case of social stresses, like social defeat (Bjorkqvist, 2001; Rygula et alli, 2005; de Jong et alli, 2005).

In animal studies, animals housed collectively showed reduced symptoms after defeat, in comparison with those housed alone; and animals that live in more stable groups (with stable hierarchies, less intra-group aggression) exhibit reduced effects after a defeat, in comparison with those housed in a more unstable group (de Jong et alli, 2005). In separate studies, defeat behaviors can be modulated by acetylcholine (Smith et al., 2015).

In human studies, individuals with greater support seem to be protected against excessive neuroendocrine activation, thereby reducing the adverse effects of stresses in general, and especially stresses of social origin. 
  
This apparent confusion, in which social defeat generates behavioral and neuroendocrine effects, both of which depending on social contextual variables, raises the question of how to interpret this data. A useful concept is the concept of “causal chain”, in which recurrent evolutionary events, in this case intra-specific competition, generates selective pressures that last for thousands of generations, influencing a whole species. This way physiological phenomena may evolve, in this case the referred neuro-endocrine phenomena, to facilitate adaptive patterns of action by individuals, in this case the referred behavioral effects. According to this framework, selective pressures generated by intra-specific competition can be considered as the ultimate cause, the neuroendocrine phenomena can be considered to be the proximate causes (sometimes also called mechanisms or moderators) and the observed behavioral alterations are considered the effects (the end events in the causal chain)(Gilbert et alli, 2002; Allen & Badcock, 2003; Rygula et alli, 2005).

Some authors, for example Randolph Nesse, warn us that patterns of behavior commonly considered inappropriate or even pathological may well have adaptive value. Evolutionary psychology provides several possible explanations for why humans typically respond to social dynamics in the way that they do, including possible functions of self-esteem in relation to dominance hierarchies. In a synchronic perspective behaviors considered abnormal may in fact be part of an adaptive response to stressors in modern or at least in old environments, for example social stressors from chronic subordination or interpersonal conflicts (Gilbert et alli, 2002; Allen & Badcock, 2003). Similarly, from a diachronic perspective various behaviors related to intra-species competition or predator-prey relationships may have played a role in the evolution of human abilities, for example defensive immobilization is hypothesized to have played a role in the evolution of both human parent-child attachment and theory of mind.

See also
 Dehumanization
 Evolutionary psychology
 Hazing 
 Learned helplessness
 Psychological trauma
 Resource holding potential
 Social rejection

References

External links
https://academic.oup.com/ilarjournal/article/55/2/221/642069/Social-Defeat-as-an-Animal-Model-for-Depression

Animal cognition
Power (social and political) concepts